A Stitch for Time is a 1987 documentary film directed by Nigel Noble. The film documents the making of the National Peace Quilt.

Background
Following the footsteps of those from The American Civil War and both World Wars, quiltmakers during the Cold War made quilts related to the conflict. Conceived in the early 80s, it began with one quilt expressing solidarity with Soviet women against nuclear proliferation and believed that they were a less abrasive way to encourage peace and piece together alienated societies.

Reception
It was nominated for an Academy Award for Best Documentary Feature.

See also
Common Threads: Stories from the Quilt-1989 Oscar-winning documentary about the NAMES Project AIDS Memorial Quilt
Soviet Union-United States relations

References

External links

A Stitch for Time at Direct Cinema Limited

1987 films
1987 documentary films
American documentary films
Films directed by Nigel Noble
Quilting
1980s English-language films
1980s American films